Llynfaes is a hamlet in the community of Bodffordd, Ynys Môn, Wales, which is 134.3 miles (216.1 km) from Cardiff and 217.2 miles (349.5 km) from London.

References

See also 
 List of localities in Wales by population

Villages in Anglesey